Zéphirin Diabré (born 26 August 1959) is a Burkinabé politician. He served in the Government of Burkina Faso as Minister of Finance from 1994 to 1996.

Biography

Diabré is an economist by training and holds a doctorate in management sciences from the Faculty of Economics and Management (BEM Management School) of Bordeaux, France. He joined the University of Ouagadougou in 1987 as assistant professor of management before joining the private sector between 1989 and 1992 as deputy director of  Brakina.

He was elected MP in 1992 under the banner of the Organization for Popular Democracy – Labour Movement (ODP–MT), but gave up his seat to his deputy to become Minister of Trade, Industry and Mines the same year. He remained in post until becoming Ministers of the Economics and Finance in 1994. Between 1996 and 1997 he served as President of the Economic and Social Council.

He later left the  Congress for Democracy and Progress (created as a result of the merger of the ODP–MT and other parties) following policy disagreement. He became a researcher at the American Harvard University, then Associate Administrator of the United Nations Development Programme and then Africa and Middle East director of the AREVA group.

On 1 March 2010, he was one of the founding members the Union for Progress and Reform (UPC), an opposition political party that advocates democratic change and "real change" in Burkina Faso. He was the UPC candidate in the November 2015 presidential election, placing second behind Roch Marc Christian Kaboré.

On July 25, 2020, Zéphirin Diabré, was invested in Ouagadougou by his party, the Union for Progress and Change (UPC), presidential candidate in November 2020.

References

Living people
1959 births
Ministers of Finance of Burkina Faso
Economy ministers of Burkina Faso
Trade ministers of Burkina Faso
Industry ministers of Burkina Faso
Union for Progress and Reform politicians
People from Ouagadougou
Harvard Institute for International Development
21st-century Burkinabé people